The Zizhong railway station() is a railway station of Chengdu–Chongqing Railway. The station is located in Zizhong County, Neijiang, Sichuan, China.

See also
Chengdu–Chongqing Railway

Stations on the Chengdu–Chongqing Railway
Railway stations in Sichuan
Railway stations in China opened in 1953